The Lycée Français International de Tokyo (LFI Tokyo,  Tōkyō Kokusai Furansu Gakuen) is a French international school in Tokyo with over 1500 students representing more than 55 nationalities. The school consists of a kindergarten, an elementary school, a middle school and a high school. 

The LFI Tokyo is one of two French schools in Japan recognized by the French Ministry of National Education, alongside the Lycée Français de Kyoto. The school is based on two campuses spanning over 2 hectares with a swimming pool, a soccer field, a gymnasium, a dojo, a tennis court, a running track and an auditorium. The school also has two libraries, two cafeterias and a dedicated music room and science room.

The school has been part of the network of establishments of the Agency for French Education Abroad (AEFE, according to its French name)since its creation in 1990.

History 
In May of 1967, a grant from the French government lead to the creation of a new building in the Gyosei School in order to teach French. In 1973, the building was bought by France, and in January of 1975 became the Lycée franco-japonais (日仏学園 Nichifutsu Gakuen). Since 1997, the student body has increased by nearly 50 students per year, leading to the relocation of some students to two other sites: the Meisho School and the Franco-Japanese Institute. At the start of the 2003 school year, the Primary students were grouped together on the Fujimi site. Secondary students and their teachers moved to the campus of the former Japanese school of Ryuhoku (Taito-Ku). On the 7th of May 2012, the school officially changed their name from the Lycée franco-japonais to Lycée Français International de Tokyo and moved to their new campus in Takinogawa.

Academics
The majority of the classes are taught in French. The school follows the French National Curriculum and prepares students for Brevet and French Baccalaureate. In 2021, 100% of the students received the Baccalaureat diploma, 90% obtained honors.

There is a bilingual French/English section in primary school and a Section européenne for Social Studies section in junior high (lower secondary) school. High school (upper secondary) students who speak Japanese may enroll in the Option international du Baccalauréat (OIB).

See also

 France–Japan relations
  (アンスティチュ・フランセ日本)
  (日仏会館)
 Lycée Français de Kyoto - A French international school in Kyoto, Japan
 List of high schools in Tokyo
 List of junior high schools in Tokyo
 List of elementary schools in Tokyo

Japanese international schools in France:
 Institut Culturel Franco-Japonais – École Japonaise de Paris
 Lycée Konan (defunct)
 Lycée Seijo (defunct)

References

Further reading

 藤沼 傑. "すりガラスと樹脂でブレースを隠す : 東京国際フランス学園(東京都北区) 設計者:山下設計+赤堀忍(イトレス&ACD) (これからの学校2013) -- (木や自然エネを生かし老朽校舎再生 学校建築の進化形)." 日経アーキテクチュア (Special), 54-57, 2013-05-25. 日経BP社. See profile at CiNii.
 "耐震改修した既存校舎と曲線状の新校舎を組み合わせる 東京国際フランス学園 : 設計 山下設計+赤堀忍/イトレス&ACD (特集 地域と共に変化する学校 : 統廃合に伴う小中学校の働きかけ)." 新建築 87(19), 174-181,201-202, 2012-12. 新建築社. See profile at CiNii.

External links

 Lycée Français International de Tokyo
 Lycée Français International de Tokyo 
 Lycée Français International de Tokyo 
 Lycée Franco-Japonais de Tokyo (Archive)

Elementary schools in Japan
French international schools in Japan
High schools in Tokyo
International schools in Tokyo
Kita, Tokyo